Bike Athletic Company is an American sportswear company with headquarters in Atlanta, Georgia. They invented the jockstrap in 1874 for bicyclists in Boston. The firm sold over 350 million jockstraps.

The company later produced additional protective sports equipment such as multipurpose knee pads, elbow pads, gloves, shoulder pads, uniform jerseys, and pants for football, basketball, baseball, and softball. At one time, Bike produced athletic shoes and a wider range of sports-related apparel.

In 2001, Bike was the official helmet supplier of the XFL American football league. Almost every player in the XFL wore a helmet made by the company.

As of 2003, Bike was part of the Russell Corporation, which is a subsidiary of Berkshire Hathaway.

In the first quarter of 2017, Russell Brands announced they would be closing down Bike. 

On April 15, 2021, the brand's website reopened for online sales, featuring a modernized version of their trademark "No. 10" jockstrap, as well as active apparel.

References

Companies based in Atlanta
American companies established in 1874
Sportswear brands
1874 establishments in Massachusetts
American companies disestablished in 2017
Defunct manufacturing companies based in Georgia (U.S. state)